Zhuhui District is an urban district of Hengyang City, Hunan province, China. The district is located in the east of the city proper and on the east shore of Xiang River, it is bordered by Shigu District to the northwest, Yanfeng District to the southwest, Hengnan County to the southeast and the south, Hengyang County to the northeast. The district has seven subdistricts, two townships and a town  under its jurisdiction.

Transport
Hengyang railway station, Hengyang North railway station and Hengyang East railway station are located here.

Administrative divisions
6 towns
 Dongyangdu
 Guangdonglu
 Hengzhoulu
 Miaopu
 Yejin
 Yuehan

1 town
 Chashan'ao

2 townships
 Heping
 Linghu

References

External links
  www.xzqh.org 

County-level divisions of Hunan
Hengyang